Pusherman is an EP by New York City noise rock band Live Skull, released in 1986 by Homestead Records. The EP's title track is a cover of "Pusherman" by Curtis Mayfield.

Track listing

Personnel 
Adapted from the Pusherman liner notes.

Live Skull
 Mark C. – guitar, vocals
 Marnie Greenholz – bass guitar, vocals
 James Lo – drums
 Tom Paine – guitar, vocals

Production and additional personnel
 Martin Bisi – mixing, recording
 Scott Miller – cover art, painting
 Live Skull – production, mixing

Release history

References

External links 
 
 Pusherman at Bandcamp

1986 EPs
Homestead Records EPs
Live Skull albums